Engelsstaub (German for "Angel dust") is a German dark wave band, founded in 1992 by Mark Hofmann as a follow-up to his previous band Les Fleurs du Mal.

Music 
Engelsstaub's music leans toward the neofolk/neo-medieval end of the gothic spectrum, with stylistic similarities to bands like Ataraxia, The Dreamside and Faith and the Muse.

Biography 
Hofmann began the band in 1992 as a solo project, but after releasing the 7" single Unholy was joined by his sister Silke Hofmann and Polish musician Janusz Zaremba, with whom he also co-founded the independent record label Apollyon.

Discography 
 Unholy (single) (1992)
 Malleus Maleficarum (1993)
 Ignis Fatuus: Irlichter (1994)
 In Amoris Mortisque (1995) (split CD with Italian neomediaeval band Ataraxia)
 Unholy (EP) (1997)
 Anderswelt (1999)
 Akashic Recordings (2002)
 Anderswelt (dts-CD) (2004)
 Nachtwärts (2011)
 The 4 Horsemen Of The Apocalypse (2015)
 Mater Mortis (2019)

Band members 
 Silke Hofmann - vocals
 Janusz Zaremba - guitars/vocals
 Mark Hofmann - programming/guitars/vocals

External links 
 
Myspace site

German musical groups